The following lists events that happened during 1981 in the Grand Duchy of Luxembourg.

Incumbents

Events

January – March
 6 January – Gaston Thorn takes up his post as President of the European Commission.
 2 February – A new newspaper, Haut, is launched.
 14 February – Hereditary Grand Duke Henri marries Maria Teresa Mestre.

April – June
 4 April – Representing Luxembourg, Jean-Claude Pascal finishes eleventh in the Eurovision Song Contest 1981 with the song C'est Peut-Etre Pas L'Amerique.
 23 April – Rights of confidentiality that patients enjoy with doctors are applied to bankers and clients to help promote Luxembourg as a financial centre.
 14 June – The Soviet Union's Yuri Barinov wins the 1981 Tour de Luxembourg.

July – September
 7 July – The European Parliament passes a resolution to 'review' the seat of the Secretariat being in Luxembourg City.
 31 July – A Belgian fighter jet collides with the 285 m Dudelange Radio Tower, destroying the tower and killing a couple in a nearby house.
 7 August – Luxembourg files an appeal with the European Court of Justice against the European Parliament's resolution of 7 July.
 15 September – Christian Calmes is appointed Grand Marshal of Luxembourg.

October – December
 10 October – Communal elections are held across Luxembourg.
 31 December – Camille Polfer steps down as Mayor of Luxembourg City after only two years, due to ill health, and is succeeded by his daughter, Lydie the following day.

Births
 1 June – Tessy Scholtes, kareteka
 16 September - Francesco Tristano Schlimé, pianist
 11 November – Guillaume, Hereditary Grand Duke of Luxembourg

Deaths
 16 September – Émile Colling, politician

Footnotes

References